Ivanhoe is a census-designated place (CDP) in Tulare County, California, United States. The population was 4,495 at the 2010 census, up from 4,474 at the 2000 census.

Geography
Ivanhoe is located at  (36.387879, -119.219081).

Climate
According to the Köppen Climate Classification system, Ivanhoe has a semi-arid climate, abbreviated "BSk" on climate maps.

Demographics

2010
At the 2010 census Ivanhoe had a population of 4,495. The racial makeup of Ivanhoe was 2,002 (44.5%) White, 19 (0.4%) African American, 80 (1.8%) Native American, 29 (0.6%) Asian, 1 (0.0%) Pacific Islander, 2,221 (49.4%) from other races, and 143 (3.2%) from two or more races. Hispanic or Latino of any race were 3,752 persons (83.5%).

The whole population lived in households, no one lived in non-institutionalized group quarters and no one was institutionalized.

There were 1,142 households, 684 (59.9%) had children under the age of 18 living in them, 679 (59.5%) were opposite-sex married couples living together, 205 (18.0%) had a female householder with no husband present, 113 (9.9%) had a male householder with no wife present.  There were 100 (8.8%) unmarried opposite-sex partnerships, and 6 (0.5%) same-sex married couples or partnerships. 102 households (8.9%) were one person and 44 (3.9%) had someone living alone who was 65 or older. The average household size was 3.94.  There were 997 families (87.3% of households); the average family size was 4.14.

The age distribution was 1,564 people (34.8%) under the age of 18, 522 people (11.6%) aged 18 to 24, 1,112 people (24.7%) aged 25 to 44, 975 people (21.7%) aged 45 to 64, and 322 people (7.2%) who were 65 or older.  The median age was 27.4 years. For every 100 females, there were 104.9 males.  For every 100 females age 18 and over, there were 107.0 males.

There were 1,217 housing units at an average density of 604.3 per square mile, of the occupied units 694 (60.8%) were owner-occupied and 448 (39.2%) were rented. The homeowner vacancy rate was 1.1%; the rental vacancy rate was 7.6%.  2,739 people (60.9% of the population) lived in owner-occupied housing units and 1,756 people (39.1%) lived in rental housing units.

2000
At the 2000 census there were 4,474 people, 1,137 households, and 966 families in the CDP. The racial makeup of the CDP was 47.41% White, 0.45% African American, 1.56% Native American, 0.63% Asian, 0.04% Pacific Islander, 40.43% from other races, and 9.48% from two or more races. Hispanic or Latino of any race were 76.15%.

Of the 1,137 households 55.3% had children under the age of 18 living with them, 61.8% were married couples living together, 16.2% had a female householder with no husband present, and 15.0% were non-families. 11.6% of households were one person and 4.7% were one person aged 65 or older. The average household size was 3.93 and the average family size was 4.22.

The age distribution was 37.8% under the age of 18, 12.4% from 18 to 24, 28.7% from 25 to 44, 15.3% from 45 to 64, and 5.7% 65 or older. The median age was 25 years. For every 100 females, there were 112.3 males. For every 100 females age 18 and over, there were 107.2 males.

The median household income was $26,052 and the median family income  was $26,166. Males had a median income of $20,410 versus $19,583 for females. The per capita income for the CDP was $9,101. About 25.6% of families and 30.8% of the population were below the poverty line, including 41.8% of those under age 18 and 10.3% of those age 65 or over.

Government

In the United States House of Representatives, Ivanhoe is in

References

Census-designated places in Tulare County, California
Census-designated places in California